Lletty Brongu railway station served the hamlet of Lletty Brongu, in the historical county of Glamorganshire, Wales, from 1898 to 1932 on the Port Talbot Railway.

History 
The station was opened on 14 February 1898 by the Port Talbot Railway and Docks Company. It closed on 12 September 1932.

References 

Disused railway stations in Bridgend County Borough
Railway stations in Great Britain opened in 1898
Railway stations in Great Britain closed in 1932
1898 establishments in Wales
1932 disestablishments in Wales